John Karl Daniels (May 14, 1875 – March 8, 1978) was a Norwegian-American sculptor.

He was born in Norway in 1874, and immigrated with his family to the United States in 1884. He attended the Mechanics Arts High School in St. Paul, Minnesota, where he first received formal training for his craft as a sculptor. He became a pupil of Knut Okerberg in Norway, and of Andrew O'Connor in Paris, France.

He was based in Minnesota, where most of his work can be found. His studio was a former icehouse, located behind the George W. and Nancy B. Van Dusen House  at 1900 LaSalle Avenue in Minneapolis.

He created war memorials for Grafton, North Dakota and Long Prairie, Minnesota. His granite Pioneers sculpture was given to the City of Minneapolis by the family of Charles Alfred Pillsbury during the Great Depression. It served as the centerpiece of a park called Pioneer Square, near the Minneapolis Central Post Office. His work includes the Soldiers Monument at Summit Park in St. Paul, the architectural ornament of the Washburn Park Water Tower in Minneapolis, and the statue of Leif Erikson at Leif Erikson Park in Duluth, Minnesota.

His sculptures at the Minnesota State Capitol include the Knute Nelson Monument and Leif Erikson on the capitol grounds, and General John B. Sanborn and Colonel Alexander Wilkin in the rotunda. At the Veterans Service Building is Earthbound, a 1956 work dedicated to the military veterans of Minnesota, and sculpted when Daniels was 80 years old.

He died in Minneapolis in 1978.

References

External links
John Karl Daniels art

Norwegian emigrants to the United States
1870s births
1978 deaths
American centenarians
Place of birth missing
20th-century American sculptors
American male sculptors
Sculptors from Minnesota
Men centenarians
20th-century American male artists